Diana María García Orrego (born 17 March 1982 in Barbosa, Antioquia), known as Diana García, is a Colombian track cyclist.  At the 2012 Summer Olympics, she competed in the Women's team sprint for the national team.

Career
García won the bronze medals in sprint, keirin and 500 m time trial in the 2002 Pan American Championships.

Career Results

2014
1st  Team Sprint, Pan American Track Championships (with Juliana Gaviria)
South American Games 
2nd  Team Sprint (with Juliana Gaviria)
3rd  Keirin
3rd  Sprint
2nd  Sprint, Central American and Caribbean Games
2015
1st Team Sprint, Copa Cuba de Pista (with Juliana Gaviria)
3rd  Team Sprint, Pan American Games (with Juliana Gaviria)
2017
Easter International Grand Prix
2nd Sprint 
2nd Keirin

References

External links

1982 births
Living people
Colombian female cyclists
Colombian track cyclists
Olympic cyclists of Colombia
Cyclists at the 2012 Summer Olympics
Sportspeople from Antioquia Department
Cyclists at the 2015 Pan American Games
Pan American Games gold medalists for Colombia
Pan American Games silver medalists for Colombia
Pan American Games bronze medalists for Colombia
Pan American Games medalists in cycling
Central American and Caribbean Games gold medalists for Colombia
Central American and Caribbean Games silver medalists for Colombia
Central American and Caribbean Games bronze medalists for Colombia
Competitors at the 2002 Central American and Caribbean Games
Competitors at the 2006 Central American and Caribbean Games
Competitors at the 2010 Central American and Caribbean Games
South American Games gold medalists for Colombia
South American Games medalists in cycling
Competitors at the 2014 South American Games
Central American and Caribbean Games medalists in cycling
Medalists at the 2015 Pan American Games
20th-century Colombian women
21st-century Colombian women
Competitors at the 2014 Central American and Caribbean Games